Thuso Nokwanda Mbedu (born 8 July 1991) is a South African actress. She rose to prominence for her performance in the South African teen drama series Is'Thunzi for which she was nominated consecutively for an International Emmy in 2017 and 2018. Mbedu later appeared on the 2018 Forbes Africa 30 under 30 list.

In 2021, she starred in the Amazon Video limited series The Underground Railroad as Cora, making her the first South African actress to lead an American television series, which earned her the Independent Spirit Award for Best Female Performance in a New Scripted Series. In 2022, Mbedu appeared on the big screen in Gina Prince-Bythewood's historical epic The Woman King in the role of Nawi.

Her other notable roles include Kitso Medupe in the soap opera Scandal!, Nosisa in Isibaya, and Boni Khumalo in the television series Saints and Sinners.

Early life
Mbedu was born at Midlands Medical Centre in Pietermaritzburg, KwaZulu-Natal to a Zulu mother and a Xhosa and Sotho father, which is reflected in her multicultural name. She was raised in the Pelham area by her Zulu grandmother, who became her legal guardian after the passing of both her parents at an early age.

Mbedu attended Pelham Primary School and then Pietermaritzburg Girls' High School. She went on to study Physical Theatre and Performing Arts Management at the University of the Witwatersrand (Wits), graduating in 2013 with honours, after also having taken a course at the Stella Adler Studio of Acting in New York City in 2012.

Career 
In late 2014, Mbedu had a small role in the second season of the Mzansi Magic soapie Isibaya, before landing her role as journalism student and wild child Kitso on Scandal!. She then had a guest role as Kheti on the second season of the SABC 2 teen drama series Snake Park.

After being unemployed for six months, Mbedu landed her first starring role in television in the Mzansi Magic teen drama series Is'Thunzi, which premiered in October 2016. In the series she played Winnie, a sassy go-getter who dreams of marrying a rich and famous rugby player only to have her dreams dashed when she is exiled to go live with her strict aunt in Bergville. While filming a rape scene for the show, she suffered a panic attack. In September 2017 she was nominated for an International Emmy Award in the category Best Performance by an Actress for her role as Winnie in Is'Thunzi and was the only African to be nominated that year.

Mbedu made her international debut as Cora in the 2021 Amazon Video historical limited series The Underground Railroad, based on the novel of the same name by Colson Whitehead and directed and executive produced by Academy Award winner Barry Jenkins. Mbedu earned a Hollywood Critics Association Award, an Independent Spirit Award, and a Gotham Award for the series.

In April 2021, it was announced Mbedu would make her film debut as Nawi opposite Viola Davis in The Woman King, a historical epic film inspired by the true events that took place in the Kingdom of Dahomey, one of the most powerful states of Africa in the 18th and 19th centuries. The film was directed by Gina Prince-Bythewood, from a script by Fatherhood co-writer Dana Stevens.

Filmography

Film

Television

Awards and nominations

Notes

References

External links 

 Thuso Mbedu's TVSA Actor Profile
 

Living people
1991 births
21st-century South African actresses
People from Pietermaritzburg
South African television actresses
University of the Witwatersrand alumni